Sathi Amar is a 2005 Bengali romantic drama film directed by Shankar Ray and produced by Pritam Jalan. The film features actors Prosenjit Chatterjee and Rachana Banerjee in the lead roles. Music of the film has been composed by Ashok Raj

It is a remake of the Tamil film Ullam Kollai Poguthae.

Plot 
Raja is a talented voice artist who lives with is sister and takes care of her after their parent's death. Things change for him when he meets Jyoti, a talented painter who is also his sister's friend. As Raja falls for Jyoti, he attempts his best to win over his beloved.

Cast 
 Prosenjit Chatterjee as Raja
 Rachana Banerjee as Jyoti, Raja's love interest
 Anubhav Mohanty as Gautam, Jyoti's fiancée
 Laboni Sarkar as Jyoti's mother
 Kanchan Mullick as Anindya, Raja's friend
 Biswanath Basu
 Pushpita Mukherjee as Manoshi, Raja's sister
 Arun Banerjee as Jyoti's father
 Ashok Mukhopadhyay
 Parthasarathi Deb

References

External links
 Prosenjit Chatterjee & Rachana Banerjee

2005 films
Bengali-language Indian films
2000s Bengali-language films